Väyrynenite is a rare phosphate mineral with formula MnBe(PO4)(OH,F). It was first described in 1954 for an occurrence in Viitaniemi, Erajarvi, Finland and named for mineralogist Heikki Allan Väyrynen of Helsinki, Finland.

It occurs in pegmatites as an alteration of beryl and triphylite. It occurs in association with eosphorite, moraesite, hurlbutite, beryllonite, amblygonite, apatite, tourmaline, topaz, muscovite, microcline and quartz.

References

Phosphate minerals
Monoclinic minerals
Minerals in space group 14